Matthew Groves (born 11 December 1988) is an English professional footballer who plays for Bristol Manor Farm. He plays as a striker.Recently joined step 5 club Bitton AFC under manager Dan Langdon.

Career
Born in Bristol, Groves graduated through the Bristol Rovers centre of excellence, based at the Bristol Academy of Sport, and was awarded his first professional contract by Rovers in May 2007. His debut for the first team came on 1 December 2007, in a second-round FA Cup match against Rushden & Diamonds when he came on as a substitute for Andy Williams.

In March 2008 Groves joined Chippenham Town on loan until the end of the 2007–08 season. At the start of the following season he moved to Tiverton Town on loan.

He made a third loan move in December 2008, this time to Mangotsfield United where he remained for three months, but after returning to his parent club he was released from his contract. After his release he was signed by Weston-super-Mare to play for them in the Conference South, where he made one start and two substitute appearances.

After a trial at another Conference South club, Weymouth, Groves signed a one-year deal in July 2009. He left the financially troubled club in March 2010 when faced with the alternative of a 50% pay cut. He had scored twice from 24 league games. He ended the 2010–11 season with a brief stint at Yate Town, before re-joining their local rivals Mangotsfield United that summer.

References

External links

Matt Groves profile at bristolrovers.co.uk
Matt Groves at Aylesbury United

1988 births
Footballers from Bristol
Living people
Association football forwards
English footballers
Bristol Rovers F.C. players
Chippenham Town F.C. players
Tiverton Town F.C. players
Mangotsfield United F.C. players
Weston-super-Mare A.F.C. players
Weymouth F.C. players
Yate Town F.C. players
Gloucester City A.F.C. players
Larkhall Athletic F.C. players
English Football League players